Several land reforms were done in Prussia, beginning at 1763, in order to liberate the peasants from the bondages of Feudalism.

Reforms in the Kingdom of Prussia 
 In 1763, Frederick II of Prussia abolished the serfdom on all Crown lands. Additionally, he issued an order to end the suppression of the peasant, relieving him and his children of domestic services to the landlord. His intentions were good - he believed that peasants should be well-treated in order to function properly. But, his reform did not have much effect, because the peasants had no land, and thus were forced to return to serving their previous lords in return to a right to till their lands.
 In 1798, Frederick William III of Prussia expressed his royal desire to see serfdom abolished throughout the kingdom, and permitted peasants to redeem their Corvée for cash payments. He also secured the rights of precarious tenants.
 In 1806, Prussia was defeated by Napoleon I and lost half its territory in the second of the Treaties of Tilsit. This was the trigger to the Prussian reforms, whose main goal was to modernize the Prussian state so that it may regain its lost power. As part of these reforms, serfdom was legally abolished throughout the kingdom. The peasant was allowed to become a free proprietor of land, if only he could buy it. Since peasants had no money, they were allowed to pay for the land by giving up their rights to assistance from their landlords and giving up their rights to use common lands for grazing. Alternatively, they could "pay" by giving some of their lands to their landlords. The net outcome was that the peasants' situation has worsened - they had less land to till, and no access to common lands. On the other hand, the nobles managed to buy much of the peasants' lands and gained exclusive access to the common lands, so land holding became more concentrated - just the opposite of what the reformers intended.
 Over the next three decades, the government made it easier for peasants to buy land, as part of a sweep towards liberal sentiment in much of western Europe.
 After the Revolutions of 1848 in the German states, peasants refused to pay their remaining obligations to their landlords. Most of these obligations were legally abolished at 1850. The price for redeeming land was set at 25 times its annual revenue, and peasants could buy land by taking mortgages from banks.

Aftermath in Germany 
 Although serfdom was legally abolished, the Prussian Junkers (members of the landed nobility) kept most of their power through the German Conservative Party in the Reichstag, until World War II.
 After WWII, in 1945, the communist Bodenreform in East Germany nationalised all private property exceeding an area of 100 hectares, and redistributed it to publicly owned estates.
 Since 1990, after German reunification, some Junkers tried to regain their former estates through civil lawsuits, but the German courts have upheld the land reforms and rebuffed all claims for compensation.

References 
 

Land reform
Kingdom of Prussia